Thunder Lake Provincial Park is a provincial park located in Alberta, Canada, and is located  west of Edmonton, on the shore of the park features setting for boating, water-skiing, swimming, running, fishing and camping. Thunder lake is approximately  West of the nearest town, Barrhead.

The park is located on the north-western shore of Thunder Lake. The main fish found are Northern Pike.

See also
List of provincial parks in Alberta
List of Canadian provincial parks
List of National Parks of Canada

References

External links
Thunder Lake. Albert Tourism, Parks and Recreation.

County of Barrhead No. 11
Provincial parks of Alberta